In 1909, Lena Park was the site of a real estate fraud in Wayne Township, Starke County, in the U.S. state of Indiana.

References

History of Indiana